Igor Rostislavovich Yankovsky (born April 29, 1951, Leninabad, Tajik Soviet Socialist Republic, Soviet Union) is a Soviet and Russian actor and a TV presenter. He is a  son of Rostislav Yankovsky, and a nephew of Oleg Yankovsky.

Biography 
He graduated from Boris Shchukin Theatre Institute in 1974.

Since 1992 he has been working in the advertising business. He is an academician of the Russian Academy of Advertising.

From September 17 to November 26, 2001 he led the game show  Alchnost (similar to the  American Greed) on the NTV channel.

He holds a degree of a Candidate of political sciences.

Selected filmography
 1973 — It is Stronger Than Me as Ivan
 1974 — Maigret and the Old Lady as Henry
 1975 — Investigation Held by ZnaToKi: Riposte as  Moralyov
 1976 — Lullaby for Men as Vsevolod 
 1979 — The Suicide Club, or the Adventures of a Titled Person as Geraldine Jr.
 1984 — Time and the Conways as Gerald Thornton in his youth
 1984 — Charlotte’s Necklace as Viktor Korablyov
 2002 — In Motion as publisher

References

External links
 

1951 births
Living people
People from Khujand
Russian male film actors
Soviet male film actors
Soviet male stage actors
Russian television presenters
Russian people of Polish descent
Soviet people of Polish descent